Zuhura Othman Soud (born 22 November 1993), better known by her stage name Zuchu, is a Tanzanian singer and songwriter born in Zanzibar. She is based in Dar es Salaam and signed to WCB Wasafi record label. She was awarded the Silver Plaque Button by YouTube for hitting 100,000 subscribers within a week. She  became the first East African female artist to reach that milestone within a week. She also became the first East African female artist to reach 1 million subscribers on YouTube 11 months later. In 2020 Zuchu was named by AFRIMMA as the winner of the Emerging Artist Award.

In 2023 Zuchu bagged 5 nominations at the Soundcity MVP Awards and also  performed at the prestigious award show

Personal life 
Zuchu comes from a musical Swahili Zanzibari family and background. She is a daughter of the revered and famous female Zanzibari Taarab musician Khadija Kopa. 

CAREER 

Zuchu started singing at a tender age and later collaborated with her mother Khadija Kopa on a song titled "Mauzauza" from her debut EP I am Zuchu. Among her first appearances as a musician to the public date back to 2015 in the first edition of TECNO OWN THE STAGE in Lagos, Nigeria.

In 2022, Zuchu  became the most subscribed female artist on Sub Saharan  African on Youtube  and few months later she became the first female artist in East Africa to clock 100 Million streams on Boomplay 

Zuchu started 2023 with a new single titled Utaniua, Utaniua was critically acclaimed as Tanzania's music journalist, Charles Maganga appreciated Utaniua as an intimate song where Zuchu pays homage to Bongo Flava and Baibuda 

In March 2023, Zuchu released her first official music video for the year 2023 for a new single titled Napambana.

Discography

Albums 
Zuchu released her debut EP album I Am Zuchu in 2020, with a total of 7 songs.

2020: I Am Zuchu

Singles and collaborations

References

External links

 
 
 
 

 Living people
 People from Dar es Salaam
 Tanzanian Muslims
 21st-century Tanzanian women singers
 Women singer-songwriters
 1993 births
 Swahili-language singers
 Tanzanian musicians
 Tanzanian Bongo Flava musicians